Saltia is a genus of moths of the family Noctuidae, endemic to the high mountains of East Africa.

Species
Two species have been described, both collected by George Salt in 1948:

Saltia acrophylax Tams, 1952 (Kilimanjaro)
Saltia edwardsi Tams, 1952 (Mount Elgon)

There is a third form on Mount Kenya, likely a third species, with one specimen in the National Museums of Kenya. This, and the above-named collections by Salt, appear to be the only collection of this genus.

References

Natural History Museum Lepidoptera genus database

Further reading
Salt G. 1954. A contribution to the ecology of upper Kilimanjaro. Journal of Ecology 42:375-423.

Hadeninae
Taxa described in 1952
Noctuoidea genera